The 2018–19 KHL season was the 11th season of the Kontinental Hockey League. The season started on 1 September 2018 and ended on 19 April 2019. Continental Cup winners CSKA Moscow became the first team to win the Gagarin Cup finals in a series sweep, defeating Avangard Omsk in four games to win their first Gagarin Cup, after two previous Finals defeats.

Season changes
For the 2018–19 season, 25 teams competed in the KHL – down from 27 in 2017–18. The two teams that were excluded from the league were HC Lada Togliatti and HC Yugra, with both teams moving to the Supreme Hockey League. As well as this, Torpedo Nizhny Novgorod were moved from the Western Conference, to the Eastern Conference; as a result, the Western Conference consisted of 12 teams and the Eastern Conference consisted of 13 teams.

The 2018–19 season featured the most games of any KHL season to date, with each team scheduled to play 62 games, up from 56 in 2017–18.

KHL World Games
This season witnessed the first time that KHL games were played in Austria and Switzerland, as part of the KHL World Games. Slovan Bratislava played in both Austrian games (on 26 and 28 October) at the Albert Schultz Eishalle in Vienna – home to the Vienna Capitals of the Austrian Hockey League – losing 9–0 to CSKA Moscow, and 7–0 to SKA Saint Petersburg. The Swiss games were played at the Hallenstadion in Zürich – home to the ZSC Lions of the Swiss National League – with Dinamo Riga playing in both games (on 26 and 28 November), losing 3–1 to SKA Saint Petersburg, and 5–0 to CSKA Moscow.

Teams
The 25 teams were split into four divisions: the Bobrov Division and the Tarasov Division as part of the Western Conference, with the Kharlamov Division and the Chernyshev Division as part of the Eastern Conference. On 24 April 2018, the KHL announced re-alignment after both Lada Togliatti and Yugra Khanty-Mansiysk left the league.

League standings
Each team played 62 games, playing each of the other twenty-four teams twice: once on home ice, and once away from home. As well as this, each team played a further two games against each of their divisional rivals, and four games total against non-divisional teams.

Points were awarded for each game, where two points were awarded for all victories, regardless of whether it was in regulation time, in overtime or after a shootout. One point was awarded for losing in overtime or a shootout, and zero points for losing in regulation time. At the end of the regular season, the team that finished with the most points was crowned the Continental Cup winner.

Western Conference

Eastern Conference

Gagarin Cup playoffs

Final standings

Player statistics

Scoring leaders

The following players led the league in points, at the conclusion of the regular season. If two or more skaters are tied (i.e. same number of points, goals and played games), all of the tied skaters are shown.

Leading goaltenders
The following goaltenders led the league in goals against average, at the conclusion of the regular season.

Awards

Season awards
The KHL's end-of-season awards ceremony was held on 28 May 2019 in Barvikha.

Players of the Month
Best KHL players of each month.

References

External links

 
Kontinental Hockey League seasons
KHL
KHL